Chelodina insculpta is an extinct species of snake-necked turtle that was described in 1897 from material gathered in Darling Downs, Queensland, Australia, restricted. It is a member of the Chelidae; Pleurodira. The fossil has been dated as Pliocene to Pleistocene.

References

Chelydera
Turtles of Australia
Extinct turtles
Fossil taxa described in 1897